The Pax Romana was a time of peace established by Emperor Augustus during the Roman Empire.

Pax Romana may also refer to:
 Pax Romana (1511), a treaty concluded in Rome in 1511 between Pope Julius II and the Roman Baronial families.
 Pax Romana (comics), a comic book created by Jonathan Hickman.
 Pax Romana (organization), an international federation of Catholic students and academics.
 "Pax Romana" (Sanctuary), a season three episode of Sanctuary
 Pax Romana, a monetary unit in The Secret World MMORPG.